Asteridea athrixioides  is a herb in the Asteraceae family, which is endemic to Australia, and found in Western Australia, South Australia and Victoria.  It was first described in 1853 by Otto Sonder and Ferdinand von Mueller as Panaetia athrixioides, who described it from specimen(s) collected in the Port Lincoln district.  In 1980, G. Kroner assigned it to the genus, Asteridea, giving it the name Asteridea athrixioides. It is an annual herb, growing on calcareous, sandy or clay soils to heights of from 5 cm to 20 cm. Its yellow flowers may seen from July to November on saline on allvial flats, rocky hills and undulating plains.

References

External links 
 Asteridea athrixioides occurrence data from the Australasian Virtual Herbarium

athrixioides
Eudicots of Western Australia
Plants described in 1853
Flora of South Australia
Flora of Victoria (Australia)
Taxa named by Ferdinand von Mueller
Taxa named by Otto Wilhelm Sonder